Falešná kočička aneb Když si žena umíní  is a Czech silent comedy film directed by Svatopluk Innemann. It was released in 1926.

Cast
 Vlasta Burian - Vendelín Pleticha
 Karel Hašler - Dr. Karel Verner
 Jiří Dréman - Janota
 Zdena Kavková - Milca Janotová
 Antonie Nedošinská - Amálka Holubová
 Jára Sedláček - Mr. Chládek
 Svatopluk Innemann - Teacher
 Milka Bálek-Brodská - Verner's Assistant
 Marie Kalmarová - Mannequin
 Ladislav H. Struna - Apache
 Anna Buriánová - Milca's Friend
 Filip Bálek-Brodsksý - Patient
 Eduard Simácek - Patient
 Josef Oliak - Patient
 Ada Velický - Patient
 Jaroslav Marvan - Policeman

External links
 

1926 films
Czech silent films
1926 comedy films
Czechoslovak black-and-white films
Czech comedy films
Silent comedy films